The Love, Lust, Faith and Dreams Tour was the third worldwide concert tour by American rock band Thirty Seconds to Mars in support of the band's fourth studio album Love, Lust, Faith and Dreams.

Background

The tour started on June 5, 2013 in Europe (Impact Festival, Warsaw, Poland), playing in open-air spaces and festivals such as Rock am Ring, Rock Werchter, Download Festival, Nova Rock Festival, and Pinkpop Festival. In mid-August 2013, the tour should have reached Australia, but due to a medical procedure the dates were rescheduled to March 2014. Also in August they played in Tokyo. In September the band performed at Rock in Rio and the iTunes Festival. In the middle of September they will continue touring in North America. By the end of October the band will return to Europe to play in arenas.
The venue in Melbourne, Australia is shifted to Hisense Arena to please Rolling Stones. Thirty Seconds to Mars later embarked on a double-headline tour, dubbed the Carnivores Tour, with American rock band Linkin Park, which spanned 25 dates in August and September 2014 in North America.

Opening acts
 New Politics (USA)
 You Me at Six (Europe)
 Twin Atlantic (Europe)
 White Lies (Australia)

Setlist
Birth 
Night of the Hunter 
Search and Destroy 
This Is War 
Conquistador 
Kings and Queens 
Do or Die 
City of Angels 
End of All Days 
Savior 
Hurricane 
Attack 
From Yesterday 
The Kill (Bury Me) 
Closer to the Edge 
Bright Lights 
Up in the air

Tour dates

References

Thirty Seconds to Mars concert tours
2013 concert tours
2014 concert tours